Brett Branan (born February 17, 1983 in Atlanta) is a defender who last played for American USL First Division side Minnesota Thunder. His older brother Dustin Branan also played professional soccer. He played for the Thunder for two seasons, making 14 appearances in his inaugural season, and 24 in his second campaign where he was second on the team in total minutes played.

He graduated from Saint Louis University in 2005.

References

1983 births
Living people
Soccer players from Atlanta
American soccer players
Clemson Tigers men's soccer players
Colorado Rapids U-23 players
USL First Division players
Minnesota Thunder players
Saint Louis Billikens men's soccer players
Greenville Lions players
USL League Two players
Association football defenders